James "Jamie" Rudolph Palumbo, Baron Palumbo of Southwark (born 6 June 1963) is a British entrepreneur and member of the House of Lords.

Biography
The eldest son of property developer Peter Palumbo, Baron Palumbo, Jamie was born in London and educated at Eton College and Worcester College, Oxford.

From 1984 to 1992, Palumbo worked in the City of London for Merrill Lynch and Morgan Grenfell in equity capital markets and property finance.

In September 1991 Palumbo, together with his school friend Humphrey Waterhouse and DJ Justin Berkmann, founded the Ministry of Sound nightclub in South London. Ministry of Sound expanded into recorded music and by 2014 had become the largest independent music company in the world. In 2016 he sold Ministry of Sound Recordings to the Sony Music Group for $104 million.

In 1994 he launched legal proceedings against his father with his sister, Annabella Adams, claiming his father had mismanaged the family trust; subsequently his father resigned as a trustee.

His debut novel about corruption in the modern world, Tomas, was published in 2009. Stephen Fry called the novel "remarkable... It's as if Thomas Pynchon and Burroughs and Vonnegut got together and had a bastard love child." His second novel, Tancredi, about short-termism in politics, was published in 2011.

Following the 2010 election Palumbo helped reorganise Lib Dem headquarters to make the party more efficient in Government. In October 2013, Palumbo was created a life peer taking the title Baron Palumbo of Southwark, of Southwark, in the London Borough of Southwark.

In 2017 he opened an animal sanctuary in Thailand with Rawipim Paijit, focused on spay and neuter, rescue, rehabilitation and rehoming of street dogs.

Personal life
He lives in London with his Thai friend, Rawipim Paijit. He has a child, born in 1991 to Atoosa Hariri.

References

External links
 Voting record at the Public Whip
 Street Dog SOS

1963 births
Living people
21st-century British novelists
Alumni of Worcester College, Oxford
English businesspeople
English people of Italian descent
Liberal Democrats (UK) donors
Liberal Democrats (UK) life peers
Ministry of Sound
People educated at Eton College
Writers from London
James
Life peers created by Elizabeth II
Sons of life peers
Palumbo